Frans Rombaut (born 28 November 1921) was a Belgian former wrestler. He competed in the men's Greco-Roman lightweight at the 1948 Summer Olympics.

References

External links
 

1921 births
Possibly living people
Belgian male sport wrestlers
Olympic wrestlers of Belgium
Wrestlers at the 1948 Summer Olympics
People from Temse
Sportspeople from East Flanders